Louise Marie-Jeanne Hersent-Mauduit (7 March 1784 – 7 January 1862) was a French painter.

Biography

She was born in Paris as the daughter of a mathematician. She married the painter Louis Hersent in 1821. Like her husband, she is known as a portrait and history painter, and she took on female pupils, among them the porcelain painter Marie Virginie Boquet and portrait painter Louise Adélaïde Desnos. She was a pupil of Charles Meynier and presumably also of her husband, Louis Hersent. She exhibited at the Paris Salon between 1810 and 1824, obtaining first-class medals in 1817 and 1819. Tardieu engraved several of her works.

References

 Print in Harvard Art museums by Pierre François Bertonnier after Louise-Maire-Jeanne Mauduit, showing that she was a productive artist before her marriage in 1821
Louise Marie Jeanne Hersent-Mauduit on Artnet

1784 births
1862 deaths
19th-century French painters
French women painters
Painters from Paris
Burials at Père Lachaise Cemetery
19th-century French women artists